Mr. Potter of Texas may refer to:

 Mr. Potter of Texas (novel), an 1888 novel by  Archibald Clavering Gunter
 Mr. Potter of Texas (film), a 1922 silent film adaptation directed by Leopold Wharton